Bhubaneswar Railway Station (BBS) serves Bhubaneswar, the capital of the Indian state of Odisha and it is the headquarters of the East Coast Railway zone of the Indian Railways. It comes under (NSG2) railway stations category of India.

History

During the period 1893 to 1896, 800 miles of East Coast State Railway was built and opened to traffic. It necessitated construction of some of the largest bridges across rivers like Brahmani, Kathajodi, Kuakhai and Birupa.

Bhubaneswar to be developed as world class railway station.

New Bhubaneswar
As Bhubaneswar railway station is getting saturated, a satellite passenger terminal is under construction at New Bhubaneswar (between Mancheswar and Barang).  While Bhubaneswar railway station is located on the southern side of the city, New Bhubaneswar railway station would be located on the northern side.

References

External links 

Railway stations in Bhubaneswar
East Coast Railway zone
Indian Railway A1 Category Stations